The 2016 Taiwan Open was a women's tennis tournament played on outdoor hard courts. It was the first edition of the event and part of the WTA International tournaments of the 2016 WTA Tour. It took place at the Yangming Tennis Center in Kaohsiung, Taiwan from 8 through 14 February 2016.

Points and prize money

Point distribution

Prize money

1 Points per the WTA.
2 Qualifiers prize money is also the Round of 32 prize money
* per team

Singles main-draw entrants

Seeds

1 Rankings as of February 1, 2016.

Other entrants
The following players received wildcards into the singles main draw:
  Hsu Ching-wen
  Lee Pei-chi
  Lee Ya-hsuan

The following players received entry from the qualifying draw:
  Miyu Kato 
  Lyudmyla Kichenok
  Ayaka Okuno
  Laura Pous Tió 
  Shérazad Reix
  Zhang Yuxuan

The following players received entry as lucky losers:
  Hiroko Kuwata
  Marina Melnikova

Withdrawals 
Before the tournament
  Jana Čepelová (Abdominal strain) → replaced by  Marina Melnikova
  Luksika Kumkhum → replaced by  Mandy Minella
  Romina Oprandi → replaced by  Kristína Kučová
  Pauline Parmentier → replaced by  Hiroko Kuwata
  Ajla Tomljanović → replaced by  Naomi Osaka
During the tournament
 Kurumi Nara (Left thigh injury)

Retirements 
 Stefanie Vögele (Dizziness)

Doubles main-draw entrants

Seeds

1 Rankings as of February 1, 2016.

Other entrants 
The following pairs received wildcards into the doubles main draw:
  Chien Pei-ju /  Lee Pei-chi
  Cho I-hsuan /  Shih Hsin-yuan

Champions

Singles

  Venus Williams def.  Misaki Doi 6–4, 6–2

Doubles

  Chan Hao-ching /  Chan Yung-jan def.  Eri Hozumi /  Miyu Kato 6–4, 6–3

References
General
Official website
Specific

Taiwan Open
WTA Taiwan Open
2016 in Taiwanese women's sport
2016 in Taiwanese tennis